Real Husbands of Hollywood (abbreviated RHOH) is an American reality television parody that originally aired on BET from January 15, 2013 to December 13, 2016. A revival series produced for streaming service BET+ premiered on February 10, 2022.

Background
The series was co-created by comedian Kevin Hart, and follows the daily lives of him and other married celebrities, each playing a fictionalized version of themselves, as they venture through their surreal life in Hollywood. Members of the initial cast include: Boris Kodjoe, Nelly, Duane Martin, J. B. Smoove, Nick Cannon, Oliver (Hart's assistant, played by James Davis), and Robin Thicke, who did not return for the second season due to his music career, though Hart has stated that the door is open for Thicke to return.

The series is intentionally filmed in a style similar to Bravo's The Real Housewives. Episodes often hinge on the "real" Kevin Hart's desperately unsuccessful attempts to climb Hollywood's celebrity social ladder (which always backfire in humiliating ways), and the character's barely-hidden jealousy of his more successful celebrity friends. A sneak peek was shown as a segment during the 2012 BET Awards and the official promo was released in October 2012.

Cast
 Kevin Hart as himself
 Duane Martin as himself
 Nelly as himself
 Cynthia McWilliams as Trina Shaw
 Boris Kodjoe as himself 
 Nick Cannon as himself
 Robin Thicke as himself
 J. B. Smoove as himself
 Jackie Long as himself 
 Dondre Whitfield as himself
 James Davis as Oliver Grant

Guest stars
Special guests during the first season include: Laila Ali, Ed O'Neill, Jennifer Freeman, Russell Simmons, Melanie Fiona, Estelle, Cedric the Entertainer, Shane Mosley, Elise Neal, Keri Hilson, La La Anthony, Rocsi Diaz, KJ Smith, Alec Mapa, Terry Crews, Tisha Campbell-Martin, Takhorra Taylor, Young Jeezy, Nicole Ari Parker, Jay Leno, Shaquille O'Neal, Faizon Love, James Davis, Common and Trey Songz.

Season 2 guest stars include Chris Rock, Conan O'Brien, Wanda Sykes, Katie Couric, Keenen Ivory Wayans, Nadine Velazquez, Kelly Rowland, Bobby Brown, Ralph Tresvant, Tichina Arnold, James Davis, Wayne Brady, Eric Benet, Selita Ebanks, Eva Marcille, Erykah Badu,  and more.

Season 3: Tamar Braxton, Mariah Carey, Regina Hall, Sanaa Lathan, George Lopez, Snoop Dogg, Jennifer Freeman, Lance Bass, Chrisette Michele, Jessica White, Fred Williamson, and more.

Season 4: Bobby Shmurda, Chris Brown, Brandy, Nia Long, Arsenio Hall, Wayne Brady, Mary J. Blige, Craig Robinson, EJ Johnson, Faith Evans, NeNe Leakes, Terry Crews, and more.

Season 5: LeToya Luckett, Nia Long, Johnny Depp, Keke Palmer and more.

Episodes
After it was announced in March 2013, a twelve episode second season premiered on October 15, 2013. The following day, on October 16, 2013, the show began airing on The Comedy Channel in Australia. In April 2014, Real Husbands of Hollywood was renewed for a third season, which premiered on October 14, 2014.

The fourth season premiered on August 18, 2015. On January 21, 2016, the show was renewed for a fifth season, which premiered on October 11, 2016.

Season 1 (2013)

Season 2 (2013)

Season 3 (2014–15)

Season 4 (2015–16)

Season 5 (2016)

Revival
On July 29, 2021, it was announced that BET+ has ordered a six-episode limited series revival and Kevin Hart, Duane Martin, Boris Kodjoe, Nick Cannon, J. B. Smoove, Robin Thicke, Nelly, Cynthia McWilliams, and Jackie Long are all set to return as well as Erica Ash. In 2022, the revival was revealed under the title Real Husbands of Hollywood -- More Kevin, More Problems, and premiered on February 10, 2022. In addition to the returning cast, the revival introduces new additions Michele Weaver and Angela Rye.

Reception
The show has received positive reviews from critics. Entertainment Weekly chose the show as No.1 for their "The Must List: The Top 10 Things We Love This Week," writing, "Step aside, Housewives! Our new favorite divas are the men who take the spotlight in star/exec producer Kevin Hart's uproariously funny reality TV spoof."

Accolades

References

External links
 

2010s American parody television series
2013 American television series debuts
2016 American television series endings
Television shows set in Los Angeles
English-language television shows
BET original programming
Reality television series parodies
Television series by 3 Arts Entertainment
2010s American black television series
American television series revived after cancellation